The Men's 3000 metres steeplechase at the 2011 All-Africa Games took place on 11 September at the Estádio Nacional do Zimpeto.

The final held at 8:09 p.m. local time.

Medalists

Records 
Prior to this competition, the existing World, African record and World leading were as follows:

Results

References

External links

3000m steeplechase